The Ahirwar, or Aharwar or Chaudhary are members of a north Indian Suryavanshi Kshatriya caste categorised among the Scheduled Castes of Kshatriya Jatav subcaste. Predominantly are members of the Scheduled Castes with a higher population in Uttar Pradesh, Madhya Pradesh. 

They are present, for example, in the state of Madhya Pradesh. The 2001 Census of India recorded them in the Bundelkhand area and as the largest caste group in Lalitpur district, Uttar Pradesh, with a total population 138,167.

Notable Ahirwar

Nathu Ram Ahirwar-was an Indian politician, social leader, former Education minister and educationist.

 Dinesh Ahirwar- Indian Politician 

Ratan Lal Ahirwar- Indian Politician

See also
 Jatav

References

Indian castes
Dalit communities
Scheduled Castes of Uttar Pradesh
Scheduled Castes of Madhya Pradesh
Scheduled Castes of Uttarakhand
Scheduled Castes of Haryana
Scheduled Castes of Delhi
Scheduled Castes of Punjab
Scheduled Castes of Chhattisgarh
Scheduled Castes of Rajasthan